A sphinx is a mythical creature with the head of a human and the body of a lion.

Sphinx or Sphynx may also refer to:

In Egypt
 Great Sphinx of Giza, the giant Sphinx statue near the Great Pyramids
 Sphinx of Memphis, a stone sphinx located near the ruins of Memphis

Geographic features

Antarctica
 Mount Sphinx, in the Prince de Ligne Mountains, Queen Maud Land
 Sphinx Hill, King George Island, South Shetland Islands
 Sphinx Island, Graham Land
 Sphinx Mountain, in the Wohlthat Mountains, Queen Maud Land
 Sphinx Peak, Victoria Land

Canada
 The Sphinx (British Columbia), a mountain in British Columbia
 Sphinx Dome, a lava dome in British Columbia

Europe
 Sphinx (Romania), a natural rock formation in the Carpathian Mountains
 Sphinx (Scotland), meteorological feature in the Cairngorms
 Sphinx, a Turkish rock outcrop in ANZAC Cove

United States
 The Sphinx (Kings Canyon National Park), in California
 The Sphinx (Wyoming), a mountain in the Wind River Range
 Sphinx Mountain (Madison County, Montana)

Arts and entertainment

Fictional entities
 Sphinx (Marvel Comics), two Marvel Comics characters
 S.P.H.I.N.X., an organization in  The Venture Bros.
 The Sphinx, a character in the 1999 film Mystery Men
 Sphinx, a character in the TV series Mahō Sentai Magiranger

Film and television
 The Sphinx (1916 film), an American lost silent film
 The Sphinx (1920 film), an Italian silent film
 The Sphinx (1933 film), an American film directed by Phil Rosen
 Sphinx (film), a 1981 American film adaptation of Robin Cook's novel (see below)
 "Sphinx" (Space Ghost Coast to Coast), a television episode
 "The Sphinx" (Extreme Ghostbusters), a television episode

Literature and periodicals
 Sphinx (novel), a 1979 novel by Robin Cook
 The Sphinx (Aeschylus), a fragmentary satyr play in the Seven Against Thebes trilogy
 The Sphinx (magazine), a 1902–1953 magazine for magicians
 The Sphinx (poem), an 1894 poem by Oscar Wilde
 The Sphinx, an 1846 short story by Edgar Allan Poe
 The Sphinx, a journal of Alpha Phi Alpha

Music
 Sphynx (band), a 1990s American dance music act
 The Sphinx (album), a 2011 album, or the title song, by Sananda Maitreya (Terence Trent D'Arby)
 The Sphinx – Das Beste aus den Jahren 1976–1983, a 2006 album by Amanda Lear
 Sphynx (album), a 2003 album by Melechesh
 "The Sphinx" (song), a 1978 song by Amanda Lear

Other media
 Sphinx (Marc Quinn sculpture), a 2006 sculpture of Kate Moss
 Sphinx, a 1984 role-playing game
 The Sphinx, a 2013 sculpture produced by Banksy during the Better Out Than In residency in New York City

Organisations
 Sphinx (senior society), a secret society at Dartmouth College
 Sphinx Senior Society, a senior society at the University of Pennsylvania
 Sphinx Organization, aiding the development of young Black and Latino classical musicians
 Sphinx Resources, a Canadian mining company
 Sphinx Systems, a Swiss firearms manufacturer

Science and technology
 Sphinx (gene), a non-coding RNA in Drosophila
 Sphinx (moth), the common name of many moths in the family Sphingidae
 Sphinx (genus), a genus of moths in the family Sphingidae
 Sphinx (satellite), an American test satellite
 Sphynx cat, a breed of hairless cat
 Sphinx tiling, a geometric tiling using the "sphinx" hexiamond

Computing
 Sphinx (documentation generator), a free, open-source, extensible documentation generator
 Sphinx (home automation system), a conceptual home environment designed in the Soviet Union in 1987
 Sphinx (search engine), an SQL full-text search engine
 CMU Sphinx, a free voice recognition engine from Carnegie Mellon University
 Sphinx, codename for Microsoft SQL Server 7.0; see History of Microsoft SQL Server

Transport
 CSS Sphynx, later the Japanese ironclad Kōtetsu, a 19th-century warship
 HMS Sphinx, several ships of the Royal Navy
 French ship Sphinx, several ships of the French Navy
 La Mouette Sphinx, a French hang glider design

Other uses
 Le Sphinx, a Paris brothel founded in 1931
 Sphinx Ting, Taiwanese actor and model
 Sphinx, a typeface produced by Deberny & Peignot
 Sphinx, a disc golf fairway driver by Infinite Discs
 Sphinx, a nickname for Franklin D. Roosevelt, the 32nd president of United States

See also
 Janusz A. Zajdel Award, initially named Sphynx (Sfinks in the Polish language)
 Sphinx and the Cursed Mummy, a 2003 action-adventure video game
 SPHINCS
 Sfinx (disambiguation)

fi:Sfinksi#Kreikkalainen sfinksi